Iceland competed at the 1992 Summer Paralympics in Barcelona and Madrid Spain. 12 competitors from Iceland won 17 medals including 3 gold, 2 silver and 12 bronze and finished 31st in the medal table. Iceland finished third in Madrid with 10 gold, 6 silvers and 6 bronze,totalizing a total of another 22 medals and finished the games at the 13th place.

Medalists

See also 
 Iceland at the Paralympics
 Iceland at the 1992 Summer Olympics

References 

1992 in Icelandic sport
Nations at the 1992 Summer Paralympics